Geranylhydroquinone 3''-hydroxylase (GHQ 3''-hydroxylase) is an enzyme with systematic name geranylhydroquinone,NADPH:oxygen oxidoreductase (3''-hydroxylating). This enzyme catalyses the following chemical reaction

 geranylhydroquinone + NADPH + H+ + O2  3''-hydroxygeranylhydroquinone + NADP+ + H2O

Geranylhydroquinone 3''-hydroxylase contains cytochrome P450.

References

External links 
 

EC 1.14.13